This is a list of chairmen and caretaker committee chairs of Obio-Akpor, a local government area of Rivers State, Nigeria.

To date, only 7 individuals have served as chairman of the local government council. 11 as caretaker committee chairs and 3 as administrators.

References

Obio-Akpor
Obio-Akpor Chairmen
Obio-Akpor Chairmen